The 2015–16 LIU Brooklyn Blackbirds men's basketball team represented The Brooklyn Campus of Long Island University during the 2015–16 NCAA Division I men's basketball season. The Blackbirds, led by fourth-year head coach Jack Perri, played their home games at the Steinberg Wellness Center, with several home games at the Barclays Center, and were members of the Northeast Conference. They finished the season 16–15, 9–9 in NEC play to finish in a tie for sixth place. They defeated Sacred Heart in the quarterfinals of the NEC tournament before losing to Wagner.

Roster

Schedule

|-
!colspan=9 style="background:#000000; color:#FFFFFF;"| Non-conference regular season

|-
!colspan=9 style="background:#000000; color:#FFFFFF;"| Northeast Conference regular season

|-
!colspan=9 style="background:#000000; color:#FFFFFF;"| NEC tournament

|-

References

LIU Brooklyn Blackbirds men's basketball seasons
LIU Brooklyn
LIU Brooklyn
LIU Brooklyn